The  Atlanta Falcons season was the franchise's 49th season in the National Football League and the seventh under head coach Mike Smith. The Falcons were defeated by the Carolina Panthers in week 17, officially eliminating them from postseason contention for the second straight year. As a result, Smith was fired after his seventh year as head coach, after two straight years with a losing record.

The 2014 Atlanta Falcons were featured on the HBO documentary series Hard Knocks.

As of 2022, the only member of the 2014 squad still a Falcon is Jake Matthews.

2014 draft class

 Note: The Falcons traded their sixth- (No. 182 overall) and original seventh- (No. 220 overall) round selections to the Minnesota Vikings in exchange for the Vikings' fifth-round selection (No. 168 overall).

Staff

Final roster

Schedule

Preseason

Regular season

Note: Intra-division opponents are in bold text.

Game summaries

Week 1: vs. New Orleans Saints

Week 2: at Cincinnati Bengals

Week 3: vs. Tampa Bay Buccaneers

In this game, Devin Hester would break Deion Sanders's all-time record for punt/kick returns for touchdowns, with 20.

Week 4: at Minnesota Vikings

Week 5: at New York Giants

Week 6: vs. Chicago Bears

Week 7: at Baltimore Ravens

Week 8: vs. Detroit Lions
NFL International Series

Week 10: at Tampa Bay Buccaneers

Week 11: at Carolina Panthers

Week 12: vs. Cleveland Browns

Week 13: vs. Arizona Cardinals

Week 14: at Green Bay Packers

Week 15: vs. Pittsburgh Steelers

The Falcons were the only NFC South team to lose to all of their AFC North opponents

Week 16: at New Orleans Saints

With the win, the Falcons swept the Saints for the 1st time since 2005 and eliminated their opponent from postseason contention.

Week 17: vs. Carolina Panthers

Standings

Division

Conference

Use of artificial crowd noise
Shortly after the end of the post-season the Falcons were investigated by the League for piping artificial crowd noise during opponent's offensive snaps at home games during the 2013 season and the 2014 season.  Team owner Arthur Blank stated that he was "angry and embarrassed" about the allegations, and has allegedly acknowledged the validity of the accusations, stating "I think what we've done in 2013 and 2014 was wrong", and promising to cooperate fully with the investigation.  The NFL fined the Falcons $350,000 and took away a fifth round draft pick in the 2016 draft as punishment.

References

External links
 

Atlanta
Atlanta Falcons seasons
2014 in sports in Georgia (U.S. state)